APEC 2022 Thailand is a year-long hosting of Asia-Pacific Economic Cooperation (APEC) meetings in Thailand took place in 2022. Thailand previously hosted APEC meetings in 2003 and 1992.

The theme for 2022 APEC meetings is "Open. Connect. Balance."

The summit returned into an in-person meeting since the 2018 summit after the 2019 summit in Chile was cancelled due to the protests at the country and the last two editions were held virtually due to the COVID-19 pandemic.

Following the assassination of Shinzo Abe, former Prime Minister of Japan, on 8 July 2022, security concerns were raised for the event that was only four months away, which lead to heightened security measures being taken by Thailand.

Logo
The APEC 2022 logo was selected from the 2021 National Youth Design Award competition, jointly organized by the Thai Foreign ministry and several Thai universities. Logo submissions were accepted from 1 May to 30 June 2021.  598 logos were submitted by people under 25 year old from many countries.

The logo selected from the contest was made by Chawanon Wongtrakuljong, an architecture student from Chulalongkorn University in Bangkok. It features a Chalom, an ancient traditional bamboo basket used to carry products and goods in Thailand. Chaloms are made with bamboo strips, tied and interlaced together to serve as a strong structure. Thus, it is used to symbolize strength, resilience, and cooperation between the nations in the region. Chalom also represents prosperous trading and commerce, since it is used to carry goods. Additionally, the logo also represents sustainability, because Chaloms are made from bamboo, an environmentally friendly material.

The 21 openings between the woven bamboo stands for the 21 APEC nations. The 3 colors used in the logo represents the motto of the meeting:

due to unknown reason, during some of the speeches, this Logo was replaced by a swastika symbol, that used the same color scheme

Events

Participants
This will be the first APEC Meeting for Australian Prime Minister Anthony Albanese, Chilean President Gabriel Boric, Philippine President Bongbong Marcos, and Hong Kong Chief Executive John Lee after their inaugurations on 23 May 2022, 11 March 2022, 30 June 2022, and 1 July 2022, respectively. It was also the last APEC meeting for Vietnamese President Nguyễn Xuân Phúc and New Zealand Prime Minister Jacinda Ardern who stepped down on 18 January 2023 (following the Pres. Phúc's resignation) and 24 January 2023 (following the Prime Minister Ardern's resignation and appointment of Chris Hipkins as Prime Minister) respectively.

Among those who chose not to attend were United States President Joe Biden, South Korean President Yoon Suk-yeol and Peruvian President Pedro Castillo, which would have been their first in-person APEC meetings, due to scheduling conflicts with the wedding of Biden's granddaughter. Biden himself was represented by Vice President Kamala Harris in his place, Yoon himself was represented by South Korean Prime Minister Han Duck-soo in his place, while Castillo was also represented by Vice President Dina Boluarte in his place. Mexican President Andrés Manuel López Obrador, who rarely undertakes foreign trips, also chose not to travel to Thailand and attend the meeting. López Obrador was represented by his Mexican ambassador to Thailand Bernardo Tello. Malaysian Prime Minister Ismail Sabri Yaakob also skipped the meeting as its schedule conflicts with the 2022 Malaysian general election, where he sought re-election as leader of the United Malays National Organisation. Russian president Vladimir Putin also did not attended the summit due to the country's invasion of neighboring Ukraine, he was represented by Deputy Prime Minister Andrey Belousov.

Additionally, recently-inaugurated leaders who had to go entirely remote for the 2020 and 2021 summits had their first in-person APEC Meeting. These were Papua New Guinean Prime Minister James Marape and Japanese Prime Minister Fumio Kishida.

Invited guests

Protests 
Multiple protests took place during APEC. Activists and civil society groups stated that the government of Thailand wanted to improve its legitimacy and to greenwash the image of the major polluters in the country. Activists say that they were monitored and intimated in the weeks leading up to the summit. 

On 18 November clashes broke out between several hundred protesters and riot police. Which resulted in multiple protesters and journalists being injured and one protester losing sight in one eye.

Notes

See also
APEC summits hosted by Thailand
 APEC Thailand 1992
 APEC Thailand 2003

References

External links
 
 
 
 

Asia-Pacific Economic Cooperation
2022 in economics
Economy of Thailand
Diplomatic conferences in Thailand
21st-century diplomatic conferences (Asia-Pacific)
2022 in international relations
2022 conferences
2022
November 2022 events in Thailand